At least two ships of the Royal Navy have been named HMS Spy:

 was a Bonetta-class sloop launched at Rotherhithe in 1756.
 was launched at Topsham in 1800 as the mercantile vessel Comet. The Royal Navy purchased and renamed her in 1804.

See also
 Spy (ship)

Royal Navy ship names